Ambohimalaza may refer to one of the following locations in Madagascar:

 Ambohimalaza, Ambovombe in Ambovombe District, Androy Region
 Ambohimalaza, Sambava in Sambava District, Sava Region